Kopeysk is a city in Chelyabinsk Oblast, Russia, located southeast of Chelyabinsk. Population:  The population growth between 2002 and 2010 was caused by the annexation of surrounding settlements.

History
Prior to 1928, this city was called Ugolnye Kopi, meaning coal mines (hence the pick on the city's coat of arms). The element "Ugolnye" was removed and the suffix "-sk" was added to indicate the locative.

Economy
 
Until the 1990s the main economic sectors were Coal (with mines such as "Capital",Currently, all the mines are closed due to the low quality of the coal and the high costs of production.
"Komsomolskaya", "Red Gornyachka", and "Central") and mechanical engineering – Kopeysk Machine-Building plant headquarter, the largest producer of coal and salt mining equipment in Russia, is located in this city.
In recent years Kopejsk has developed a diversified economy. The city recorded more than 1,000 industrial enterprises and more than 7,000 private entrepreneurs. Existing companies produce goods such as plastic film, pipes with anticorrosive coating, ceramic proppant for the oil and gas industries, and vegetable oils.

Housing is being constructed, for example in the satellite city of Chelyabinsk.

Administrative and municipal status
Within the framework of administrative divisions, it is, together with three rural localities, incorporated as the City of Kopeysk—an administrative unit with the status equal to that of the districts. As a municipal division, the City of Kopeysk is incorporated as Kopeysky Urban Okrug.

Notable people
 

Sergey Kovalev (born 1983), Russian professional boxer
Timur Morgunov (born 1996), Russian pole vaulter
Sergei Ushakov (born 1965), Russian professional football coach and former player

References

Notes

Sources

External links
Official website of Kopeysky Urban Okrug 
Unofficial website of Kopeysk 

Cities and towns in Chelyabinsk Oblast